Dead Lake is a lake in the Uinta Mountains in the northwestern corner of Uintah County, Utah, United States.

Description

Dead Lake is seemingly devoid of life, hence the name.

See also

 List of lakes in Utah

References

Lakes of Utah
Lakes of Uintah County, Utah